Sadat-e Chahan (also Romanized as Sādāt-e Chāhan; also known as Sa‘adat and Sādāt) is a village in Zilayi Rural District, Margown District, Boyer-Ahmad County, Kohgiluyeh and Boyer-Ahmad Province, Iran. At the 2006 census, its population was 1,177, in 229 families.

References 

Populated places in Boyer-Ahmad County